David Gordon Steuart (January 26, 1916 – November 5, 2010) was a Saskatchewan politician, cabinet minister and senator.

Born in Regina, Saskatchewan, the son of Francis J. Steuart and Abbie Cory Thomas, Steuart moved to Prince Albert with his family in 1936. In the same year, he married Eunice Mary Cooke. Steuart served as a navigator in the Royal Canadian Air Force during World War II. He was elected to Prince Albert city council in 1951 and served as mayor from 1954 to 1958. He also served as president of the Saskatchewan Urban Municipalities Association.

A member of the Saskatchewan Liberal Party's provincial executive he helped former Co-operative Commonwealth Federation MP Ross Thatcher win the Liberal Party's leadership convention in 1959 and also became president of the party that year.

He failed in his 1960 bid to win a seat in the Saskatchewan legislature but won a by-election two years later and retained the Prince Albert seat in the 1964 provincial election that brought the Thatcher Liberals to power.

Steuart was appointed Minister of Health in the provincial cabinet implementing the government's system of user fees for health care and, in 1965, became Minister of Natural Resources and Deputy Premier. In 1967, he became Minister of Finance.

Steuart's budgets were blamed for the Liberal Party's defeat in the 1971 provincial election. Nevertheless, Steuart was elected party leader in December 1971 following Thatcher's death. He served as Leader of the Opposition for four years resigning the party leadership two days after the 1975 provincial election in which the party was badly defeated.

He was appointed to the Canadian Senate in December 1976 and served until his retirement in 1991, when he moved to Kelowna, British Columbia.

Steuart died at home in Kelowna on November 5, 2010, at the age of 94.

References

External links
 
Saskatchewan Archives Board - Election Results By Electoral Division

1916 births
2010 deaths
Saskatchewan Liberal Party MLAs
Leaders of the Saskatchewan Liberal Party
Members of the Executive Council of Saskatchewan
Canadian senators from Saskatchewan
Liberal Party of Canada senators
Mayors of Prince Albert, Saskatchewan
Politicians from Regina, Saskatchewan
20th-century Canadian politicians